Capadocia: Un Lugar Sin Perdón ("Cappadocia: A Place Without Pardon") is a Mexican HBO Latin America television series. It started on March 2, 2008, and ran for 3 seasons.

Plot
The show tells the stories of several women imprisoned for different reasons in an experimental penal complex in Mexico City.

Cast

Main cast

Supporting cast

Episode

Series overview

Season 1 (2008)

Season 2 (2010)

Season 3 (2012)

See also
 Bad Girls (1999)
 Wentworth (2013)

External links
 

Spanish-language HBO original programming
HBO Latin America original programming
2000s Mexican television series
2008 Mexican television series debuts
Mexican LGBT-related television shows
Mexican crime television series
Mexican drama television series
Imprisonment and detention of women